This article comprises a list of victories accounts races won by the  team. The races are categorized according to the UCI Continental Circuits rules. The team was in the UCI Continental category from 2005 to 2006 then up to UCI Professional Continental from 2007 till 2008. In 2009 the Team stepped up to the UCI World Tour.

Sources:

2005 TIAA-CREF
Stage 1 (ITT) Tour of Puerto Rico, Timothy Duggan

2006 TIAA-CREF

Stage 1 Tour of Normandy, Bradly Huff
Stage 4 Tour of the Gila, Rahsaan Bahati
Stage 2 FBD Insurance Rás, Danny Pate
Stage 4a (ITT) Tour de Beauce, Danny Pate
Stage 6 Tour of Utah, Blake Caldwell

2007 Slipstream-Chipotle

Stage 1 (ITT) Tour of the Bahamas, William Frischkorn
Stage 3 Tour of the Gila, Tom Peterson
Stage 5 Tour de Beauce, Ian MacGregor
Stage 6 Tour de Toona, Taylor Tolleson
Stage 2 Giro della Valle d'Aosta, Dan Martin
Univest Grand Prix, William Frischkorn
Stage 5 Tour of Missouri, Danny Pate
Stage 6 Vuelta Chihuahua Internacional, William Frischkorn

2008 Garmin-Chipotle

 Overall Tour of the Bahamas, Tyler Farrar
Stages 2 & 3 Tyler Farrar
Stage 3 (ITT) Circuit de la Sarthe, Christian Vande Velde
Stage 4 (ITT) Tour de Georgia, Trent Lowe
Stage 1 (TTT) Giro d'Italia
 Overall Delta Tour Zeeland, Christopher Sutton
 Overall Route du Sud, Dan Martin
Stages 1 & 6 Tour of Pennsylvania, Daniel Holloway
Univest Grand Prix, Lucas Euser
 Overall Tour of Missouri, Christian Vande Velde
Stage 3 (ITT) Christian Vande Velde
Stage 1 Tour du Poitou-Charentes, Tyler Farrar

2009 Garmin-Slipstream

 Overall Jayco Herald Sun Tour Bradley Wiggins
Stages 2–4 Christopher Sutton
Stage 5 (ITT) Bradley Wiggins
 Overall Circuit Franco-Belge Tyler Farrar
Stages 1 & 2 Tyler Farrar
 Overall Delta Tour Zeeland Tyler Farrar
Stage 1 (ITT) Tyler Farrar
 Overall Tour of Missouri David Zabriskie
Vattenfall Cyclassics, Tyler Farrar
Stages 1–2 & 4 Eneco Tour of Benelux, Tyler Farrar
Vuelta a España
Stage 11 Tyler Farrar
Stage 12 Ryder Hesjedal
Stage 20 (ITT) David Millar
Stage 4 Paris–Nice, Christian Vande Velde
Stage 3 Tirreno–Adriatico, Tyler Farrar
Stage 2 Tour of California, Tom Peterson
Stage 3 (ITT) Three Days of de Panne, Bradley Wiggins
Stage 1 (TTT) Tour of Qatar
Stage 4 (ITT) Vuelta a Burgos, Tom Danielson
Stage 1 Tour of Britain, Christopher Sutton

2010 Garmin-Transitions

 Overall Tour of Poland, Dan Martin
Stage 5 Dan Martin
 Overall Three Days of De Panne, David Millar
Stage 3 David Millar
 Overall Delta Tour Zeeland, Tyler Farrar
 Overall Tour of the Bahamas, Caleb Fairly
Stage 3 Caleb Fairly
Vattenfall Cyclassics, Tyler Farrar
Scheldeprijs, Tyler Farrar
Tre Valli Varesine, Dan Martin
Stage 5 & 21 Vuelta a España, Tyler Farrar
Stages 2 & 10 Giro d'Italia, Tyler Farrar
 Eneco Tour
Stage 1a Svein Tuft
Stage 5 Jack Bobridge
Stage 3 (ITT) Critérium International, David Millar
Tour of California
Stage 3 David Zabriskie
Stage 8 Ryder Hesjedal
Stages 1 & 2 Vuelta a Murcia, Robert Hunter
Stage 5 (ITT) Danmark Rundt, Svein Tuft

2011 Garmin–Cervélo

 Overall Tour Down Under, Cameron Meyer
Stage 4 Cameron Meyer
Paris–Roubaix, Johan Vansummeren
Tour de France
Stage 2 (TTT)
Stage 3 Tyler Farrar
Stages 13 & 16 Thor Hushovd
Stage 21 (ITT) Giro d'Italia, David Millar
Stage 4 Tour de Suisse, Thor Hushovd
Stage 9 Vuelta a España, Dan Martin
Stage 6 Tour of Poland, Dan Martin
Stages 2 & 3 Tour of Qatar, Heinrich Haussler
Stage 6 (ITT) Tour of California, David Zabriskie
Stage 4 Tour of Britain, Thor Hushovd

2012 Garmin-Barracuda/Garmin-Sharp

 Overall Giro d'Italia, Ryder Hesjedal
Stage 3 (TTT)
 Overall USA Pro Cycling Challenge, Christian Vande Velde
Stages 1 & 5 Tyler Farrar
Stage 3 Tom Danielson
 Overall Tour de l'Ain, Andrew Talansky
Stage 4 Andrew Talansky
Omloop Het Nieuwsblad, Sep Vanmarcke
Stage 12 Tour de France, David Millar
Stages 2 & 3 Tour Méditerranéen, Michel Kreder
Stage 2 (TTT) Tour of Qatar
Stage 1 (ITT) Tour de Langkawi, David Zabriskie
Stage 5 (ITT) Tour of California, David Zabriskie
 Circuit de la Sarthe
Stage 2 Michel Kreder
Stage 4 Thomas Dekker
Stage 2 Glava Tour of Norway, Raymond Kreder
Stage 2 (TTT) Tour of Utah
Stages 1 & 4 Tour de Vineyards, Jack Bauer

2013 Garmin-Sharp

 Overall Volta a Catalunya, Dan Martin
Stage 4 Dan Martin
 Overall Tour of Utah, Tom Danielson
Stage 3 Lachlan Morton
 Overall Tour of Alberta, Rohan Dennis
Stage 3 Rohan Dennis
Liège–Bastogne–Liège, Dan Martin
Japan Cup, Jack Bauer
Stage 9 Tour de France, Dan Martin
Stage 11 Giro d'Italia, Ramūnas Navardauskas
Stage 3 Paris–Nice, Andrew Talansky
Stage 2 Tour de Romandie, Ramūnas Navardauskas
Stage 4 Tour of California, Tyler Farrar
Stage 4 Four Days of Dunkirk, Michel Kreder
Stage 3 Tour de l'Eurometropole, Tyler Farrar
Stage 1 Bayern-Rundfahrt, Alex Rasmussen

2014 Garmin-Sharp

 Overall Critérium du Dauphiné, Andrew Talansky
 Overall Circuit de la Sarthe, Ramūnas Navardauskas
Stage 4 Ramūnas Navardauskas
 Overall Tour of Utah, Tom Danielson
Stage 4 Tom Danielson
 Overall Tour of Britain, Dylan van Baarle
Egmond-pier-Egmond, Sebastian Langeveld
ProRace Berlin, Raymond Kreder
Giro di Lombardia, Dan Martin
Japan Cup, Nathan Haas
Stages 4 & 7 Paris–Nice, Tom-Jelte Slagter
Stage 19 Tour de France, Ramūnas Navardauskas
Stage 14 Vuelta a España, Ryder Hesjedal
Stage 3 Tour of Beijing, Tyler Farrar
Stage 4 Tour of Beijing, Dan Martin
Stage 3 Tour of California, Rohan Dennis
Stage 7 USA Pro Cycling Challenge, Alex Howes
Herald Sun Tour
Prologue Jack Bauer
Stage 1 Nathan Haas
Stage 1 Tour de l'Ain, Raymond Kreder
Stage 1 Tour de San Luis, Phil Gaimon
Stage 5 Tour de Vineyards, Jack Bauer

2015 Cannondale-Garmin 

 Overall Circuit de la Sarthe, Ramūnas Navardauskas
 Overall Tour of Utah, Joe Dombrowski
Stage 6, Joe Dombrowski
Stage 1 Critérium International, Ben King
Stage 4 Giro d'Italia, Davide Formolo
Stage 8 Tour of Austria, Moreno Moser
Stages 2 & 4 Tour of Alberta, Tom-Jelte Slagter
Stage 5 Tour of Alberta, Lasse Norman Hansen

2016 Cannondale/Cannondale–Drapac 

Stage 1 Tour du Haut Var, Tom-Jelte Slagter
GP Industria & Artigianato di Larciano, Simon Clarke
Stage 2 Tour of California, Ben King
Stage 5 Tour of California, Toms Skujiņš
Stage 6 Tour of Utah, Andrew Talansky 
Stage 1 (TTT) Czech Cycling Tour
Stage 5 Tour of Britain, Jack Bauer
Japan Cup, Davide Villella

2017 Cannondale–Drapac 

Stage 2 Settimana Internazionale di Coppi e Bartali, Toms Skujiņš
Stage 5 Tour of California, Andrew Talansky
Stage 17 Giro d'Italia, Pierre Rolland
Stage 3 Route du Sud, Pierre Rolland
Stage 4 Route du Sud, Tom Scully
Stage 2 Tour of Austria, Tom-Jelte Slagter
Stage 9 Tour de France, Rigoberto Urán
Stage 2 Colorado Classic, Alex Howes
Milano–Torino, Rigoberto Urán

2018 EF Education First–Drapac p/b Cannondale 

Stage 5 Colombia Oro y Paz, Rigoberto Urán
Stage 3 Vuelta a Andalucía, Sacha Modolo
Stage 4 Circuit de la Sarthe, Daniel McLay
Stage 3 Tour of Slovenia, Rigoberto Urán
Stage 5 Vuelta a España, Simon Clarke
Stage 17 Vuelta a España, Michael Woods

2019 EF Education First Pro Cycling 

Stage 1 Herald Sun Tour, Daniel McLay
Stage 2 Herald Sun Tour, Michael Woods
Stage 1 (TTT) Tour Colombia
Stage 1 Tour du Haut Var, Sep Vanmarcke 
Stage 7 Paris–Nice, Daniel Martínez
Tour of Flanders, Alberto Bettiol
Stage 9 Tour de Suisse, Hugh Carthy
Stage 5 Tour of Utah, Lachlan Morton
Stage 6 Tour of Utah, Joe Dombrowski
Bretagne Classic Ouest–France, Sep Vanmarcke
Stage 18 Vuelta a España, Sergio Higuita
Milano–Torino, Michael Woods 
Stage 2 Tour of Guangxi, Daniel McLay

2020 EF Pro Cycling 

 National Time Trial Championships, Sergio Higuita
 National Road Race Championships, Sergio Higuita
Stage 2 Étoile de Bessèges, Magnus Cort
Stage 5 (ITT) Étoile de Bessèges, Alberto Bettiol
 Overall Tour Colombia, Sergio Higuita
Stage 1 (TTT)
Stage 4, Sergio Higuita
Stage 6, Daniel Martínez
La Drôme Classic, Simon Clarke
 Overall Critérium du Dauphiné, Daniel Martínez
Stage 3 Tirreno–Adriatico, Michael Woods 
Stage 13 Tour de France, Daniel Martínez
Stage 3 Giro d'Italia, Jonathan Caicedo
Stage 9 Giro d'Italia, Ruben Guerreiro
Stage 7 Vuelta a España, Michael Woods 
Stage 12 Vuelta a España, Hugh Carthy 
Stage 16 Vuelta a España, Magnus Cort

2021 EF Education–Nippo 

Stage 3 (ITT) Paris–Nice, Stefan Bissegger
Stage 8 Paris–Nice, Magnus Cort
Stage 18 Giro d'Italia, Alberto Bettiol
Stage 4 Tour de Suisse, Stefan Bissegger
Stage 7 (ITT) Tour de Suisse, Rigoberto Urán
Stage 4 Route d'Occitanie, Magnus Cort
 National Time Trial Championships, Lawson Craddock
Clásica de San Sebastián, Neilson Powless
Stage 5 Vuelta a Burgos, Hugh Carthy
Stage 7 Tour de Pologne, Julius van den Berg
Stages 6, 12 & 19 Vuelta a España, Magnus Cort
Stage 2 (ITT) Benelux Tour, Stefan Bissegger
Giro della Toscana, Michael Valgren
Coppa Sabatini, Michael Valgren

2022 EF Education–EasyPost 

Stage 3 (ITT) UAE Tour, Stefan Bissegger
Stage 1 O Gran Camiño, Magnus Cort
Stage 4 (ITT) O Gran Camiño, Mark Padun
Mont Ventoux Dénivelé Challenge, Ruben Guerreiro
 National Time Trial Championships, Ben Healy
 National Road Race Championships, Merhawi Kudus
Stage 10 Tour de France, Magnus Cort
 UEC European Time Trial Championships, Stefan Bissegger
Stage 17 Vuelta a España, Rigoberto Urán
Japan Cup, Neilson Powless

2023 EF Education–EasyPost 

Prologue Tour Down Under, Alberto Bettiol
Trofeo Ses Salines–Alcúdia, Marijn van den Berg
Grand Prix La Marseillaise, Neilson Powless
 Overall Étoile de Bessèges, Neilson Powless
 National Road Race Championships, Esteban Chaves
 National Time Trial Championships, Stefan de Bod
 National Time Trial Championships, Jonathan Caicedo
 National Road Race Championships, Richard Carapaz
Stages 2 & 3 Volta ao Algarve, Magnus Cort

Supplementary statistics
Sources

Notes

References

TIAA
Wins